This is a list of the state-level constitutions of Venezuela.

The State Constitutions of Venezuela are the fundamental charters of the federal entities of Venezuela, which were approved by each of their respective regional parliaments (called the Legislative Councils of Venezuela) in accordance with the guidelines on State Public Power established in Chapter III (Articles 159–167) of Title IV of the 1999 Constitution of the Republic.

List

External links
 CityMayors feature

References

Constitutions of Venezuela
State legislatures of Venezuela
States of Venezuela